A Summer Night was a Canadian music variety television series which aired on CBC Television in 1962.

Premise
Summer events and pastimes were the theme of this series which was hosted by Shirley Harmer and Alan Hamel. Topics included summertime fashion and what hockey players such as Bernie Geoffrion did between playing seasons. Series music was performed by the Billy Van Four, Tommy Common and Harmer under the direction of Denny Vaughan.

Scheduling
The half-hour series aired at 9:00 p.m. (Eastern) from 29 June to 21 September 1962.

References

External links
 
 

CBC Television original programming
1962 Canadian television series debuts
1962 Canadian television series endings